Bellebrune is a commune in the Pas-de-Calais department in the Hauts-de-France region in northern France.

Geography

Population

Sights
 The ruins of an 11th-century castle.
 The church of St. Leu, dating from the fifteenth century.
 The Château de La Villeneuve, dating from the seventeenth century.

See also
Communes of the Pas-de-Calais department

References

Communes of Pas-de-Calais